Switchstance may refer to:
Switch stance, in board sports, standing opposite to ones natural standing position
Switchstance (album), 1996 Quarashi album